Saint-Pierre-d'Oléron is a commune in the French department of Charente-Maritime, southwestern France. It is located on the island of Oléron. As the largest city on the island, it is widely considered to be the island's main city.

Population

See also
Communes of the Charente-Maritime department

References

Communes of Charente-Maritime
Oléron
Aunis
Charente-Maritime communes articles needing translation from French Wikipedia
Populated coastal places in France